The women's freestyle 51 kilograms is a competition featured at the 2007 World Wrestling Championships, and was held at the Heydar Aliyev Sports and Concert Complex in Baku, Azerbaijan on 22 September 2007.

This freestyle wrestling competition consists of a single-elimination tournament, with a repechage used to determine the winner of two bronze medals.

Results
Legend
F — Won by fall

Final

Top half

Bottom half

Repechage

References

Women's freestyle 51 kg